The O'Neills is a radio and TV serial drama.  The radio iteration of the show aired on Mutual, CBS and NBC from 1934 to 1943. Created by actress-writer Jane West, the series was sponsored at various times by Gold Dust, Ivory Snow, and Standard Brands.  It was telecast on the DuMont Television Network   in 1949 and 1950.

Characters and story

In the midwestern town of Royalton, the widowed Mother O'Neill (Kate McComb) raises her children, Danny (Jimmy Tansey) and Peggy (Joan Banks) Living upstairs in the O'Neill's two-family house was Mother O'Neill's friend, the meddling Trudy Bailey (Jane West). After their father's death, teenager Janice Collins (Janice Gilbert) and her brother Eddie Collins (Jimmy Donnelly) move into the O'Neill house.  Helen Shields played Eileen Turner. In 1941, Claudia Morgan joined the cast in the role of Laura Penway.

Organist William Meeder supplied the music. The announcers were Ed Herlihy and Howard Petrie.

Television

New cast member Janice Gilbert remained with the series when it was telecast on DuMont Tuesdays at 9pm ET from September 6, 1949, until January 10, 1950.

See also
List of programs broadcast by the DuMont Television Network
List of surviving DuMont Television Network broadcasts
1949-50 United States network television schedule

Bibliography
David Weinstein, The Forgotten Network: DuMont and the Birth of American Television (Philadelphia: Temple University Press, 2004) 
Alex McNeil, Total Television, Fourth edition (New York: Penguin Books, 1980) 
Tim Brooks and Earle Marsh, The Complete Directory to Prime Time Network TV Shows, Third edition (New York: Ballantine Books, 1964)

References

External links
The O'Neills short story, Radio and Television Mirror, June 1940, page 8
Raised on Radio by Gerald Nachman
The O'Neills (TV series) at IMDB
DuMont historical website

1934 radio programme debuts
1943 radio programme endings
1949 American television series debuts
1950 American television series endings
Black-and-white American television shows
DuMont Television Network original programming
Television series based on radio series
1930s American radio programs
1940s American radio programs
American radio soap operas
Mutual Broadcasting System programs
CBS Radio programs
NBC radio programs
Radio programs about families
Television series about families
Radio programs adapted into television shows